Tsukasa Hirakawa (born 10 January 1964) is a Japanese luger. He competed at the 1984 Winter Olympics and the 1988 Winter Olympics.

References

External links
 

1964 births
Living people
Japanese male lugers
Olympic lugers of Japan
Lugers at the 1984 Winter Olympics
Lugers at the 1988 Winter Olympics
Sportspeople from Sapporo